Visa requirements for Albanian citizens are administrative entry restrictions by the authorities of other nations placed on citizens of Albania.

 Albanian citizens had visa-free or visa on arrival access to 115 countries and territories, ranking the Albanian passport 51st in terms of travel freedom according to the Henley Passport Index.

Visa requirements map

Visa requirements

Territories and disputed areas

Visa requirements for Albanian citizens for visits to various territories, disputed areas, partially recognized countries and restricted zones:

Visas for Cambodia, Myanmar, Rwanda, São Tomé and Príncipe and Sri Lanka are obtainable online.

Non-visa travel restrictions

See also

 Visa policy of Albania
 Albanian passport

References and Notes
References

Notes

Albania
Foreign relations of Albania